Rear-Admiral Sir Morgan Charles Morgan-Giles,  (19 June 1914 – 4 May 2013) was a Royal Navy officer, decorated during the Second World War, who later served as a Conservative Member of Parliament. At the time of his death, he was the oldest living former member of the House of Commons.

Early life
The eldest son of Francis Charles Morgan-Giles OBE, Naval architect and yacht designer, and Ivy Constance Morgan-Giles (née Carus-Wilson), Morgan-Giles' childhood was spent idyllically "messing around with boats" at Teignmouth, where his father had his boatyard. The family lived across the river at Shaldon, necessitating a short row across the Teign River several times a day. Morgan-Giles said that he could "row before he could walk".

Morgan-Giles' first memory was of his father (on sick leave from the Royal Navy with petrol poisoning during the First World War) building a little dinghy for his young son. Due to the war, there was a shortage of good wood, and legend has it that FC Morgan Giles could not find quite what he wanted to finish her off. His wife came home one day to find the best table in the house had mysteriously vanished but the little boat had a new mahogany transom. When the boat was completed (she was called Pip Emma and is now in the National Maritime Museum Cornwall in Falmouth) the three-year-old Morgan was placed in her and launched out to sea. This started off his lifelong passion for boats and the sea.

As a child Morgan-Giles' family would spend their Easter holidays at Swallerton Gate on Dartmoor. In 1928, when he was 14 he managed to save enough pocket money to buy a Douglas flat-twin motorbike for £2, which was also 14 years old. In addition to this form of transport, he was lent a little motor boat, one of the first in-board motor boats, originally designed and built by his father, called Shush (also in the National Maritime Museum Cornwall) in which he spent nearly every waking hour, buzzing about on the river. His father built a succession of sailing boats for Morgan, and his brothers and sister, to race, which they did with great success at regattas up and down the coast of Devon and Cornwall.

Morgan-Giles was educated at Clifton College. At Clifton he demonstrated his ability to work the system as he wanted to crew for his father in a sailing race, but was told that instead he must attend a cricket match between Clifton College and Tonbridge School. So he took the train to London, passed through the turnstile at Lord's Cricket Ground; straight in, round and out again, and took the train down to Ryde, on the Isle of Wight, where father and son entered the race, and won; this was the Prince of Wales Cup, one of the most prestigious National dinghy races of the year.

Early naval career
Morgan-Giles joined the China Fleet as a midshipman at 18 in 1932, serving on a variety of ships, including Yangtze river patrol boats. He first sailed in the training cruiser  to the West Indies and the Baltic. He was promoted to Torpedo Specialist in 1938.

Second World War
During the Second World War, Morgan-Giles served on  during the Norwegian Campaign in 1940,  escorting Atlantic convoys, and took part in the Battle of Oran. In 1941, he was sent to the Suez Canal, where he was in charge of the anti-magnetic mine campaign. In April of that year, he acted as a liaison with the Royal Air Force using Wellington bombers as torpedo bombers. During his time with No. 201 Group RAF at Dekheila he survived three serious aeroplane crashes (one of which he was the sole survivor). Following a period of staff training at the Royal Naval College, Greenwich, Morgan-Giles was then send to the Far East as Staff Officer Operations of Force W. There he accepted the Japanese surrender of Thailand.

George Medal
Morgan-Giles was awarded the George Medal for "gallantry and undaunted devotion to duty" during bomb and mine disposal work while serving at HMS Nile, the naval base at Ras el-Tin Point, Alexandria. Morgan-Giles had been sent to help clear the ships from the harbour as quickly as possible, because they were loaded with explosive and ammunition, and (although unknown at the time) mustard gas. Whilst on board , helping to get move the ship out of the harbour to minimise losses, a bomb struck a nearby ammunition ship, and he was hurled the length of the deck, but was uninjured amongst the wreckage and fire. He was nevertheless able to climb onto an American Liberty ship, SS Lyman Abbott that was blocking the harbour exit. Once aboard, he found not a single man alive, and no power, therefore no method of weighing her anchor. He, and two other men that had joined him, were therefore forced to tamp explosive into the anchor chain, light the fuse and take cover. The explosion severed the cable, and they eventually managed to get the ship towed out of the way. It emerged after the war that Lyman Abbott had also had mustard gas on board. Had Lyman Abbott been hit whilst still inside Bari's harbour, the casualties from the mustard gas would likely have been extensive.

Siege of Tobruk
As an Acting Lieutenant Commander, he joined Sir Fitzroy Maclean's mission to Yugoslavia in October 1943, at his particular request. Initially the Admiralty wanted to send him elsewhere, so Fitzroy had to appeal to the top..."you said I could have anyone I want for this mission", he asked Winston Churchill, "and I want Morgan Giles". The prime minister agreed, over-ruled the Second Sea Lord, and Morgan joined Fitzroy in Cairo, and was promoted to Acting Lieutenant-Commander. Morgan-Giles became the Senior Naval Officer, based in Vis, in charge of running boats with guns and supplies across the Adriatic from Italy to the Dalmatian Islands in support of Tito's partisans. While aboard , he commanded a Royal Navy force off the Kvarner Gulf Pag Island in Action of 1 November 1944 against the Kriegsmarine.

Post-war
From 1945 to 1948 Morgan-Giles served in Ceylon, Cape Town, England, and Trieste. In 1950 he became the Captain of HMS Chieftain, then stationed in Malta. In 1953, he was promoted to Chief of Naval Intelligence, Far East. He became Captain (D) of the Dartmouth Training Squadron in 1957, then moved to HMS Vernon Torpedo School in 1958. He was promoted to rear admiral in 1963, the same year he became President of Royal Naval College, Greenwich. He left the Royal Navy in January 1964 to stand for Parliament.

Parliamentary career
Retiring from the Royal Navy in January 1964, Morgan-Giles stood for Parliament for the Conservative Party in his local constituency of Winchester at a by-election following the resignation of Peter Smithers (who had been appointed to the Council of Europe) and was elected a Member of Parliament on 14 May 1964. He is known to have regarded being an MP as a retirement occupation. His House of Commons speeches were often greeted by affectionate Labour Party cries of "Send a gunboat" because of the impression that he gave of steaming into action with all guns blazing on behalf of his constituency and also in loyal protection of any perceived threat to the Services.

Charles Moore writing in the Spectator regarded his Pro bono publico. No bloody panico utterance to stop a row over Europe as his best contribution to Parliament – a sentence also used by Norman Tebbit about the in-fighting in the Conservative party during the 2016 United Kingdom European Union membership referendum.

Once, while still in hospital after a riding accident, Morgan-Giles wrote to James Callaghan, the then prime minister, of "the cold, silent, teeth-clenched fury" among servicemen about a pay review board, which "did not seem to know, in blunt nautical language, whether it's on its arse or elbow". He complained that Wrens only received threepence extra a day after four years' good service: "That is not much to give a girl for saying 'Yes, Sir' all day and then 'No, Sir' all night." Yet he opposed Wrens serving on warships because: "woman’s eternal role is to create life and nurture it; a fighting man must be prepared to kill. Women do wonderful things for men but combat duty to defend us should not be one of them. Vive la difference." He served in the House of Commons until 1979, when he stood down and was succeeded by John Browne.

Other interests
In 1971, hearing that his beloved  was due to be scrapped, Morgan-Giles started "Operation Sea Horse", which had the object of forming the "HMS Belfast Trust", and saving the Belfast by transforming her into a museum. The Belfast became part of the Imperial War Museum in 1978. Morgan-Giles was Prime Warden of the Shipwrights' Company 1987–88. He had farming interests in Hampshire and New South Wales.

Awards and honours
Morgan-Giles was Mentioned in Despatches once in 1942, twice in 1944, and once more in 1945. He received the George Medal in 1941, was appointed a Member of the Order of the British Empire in 1944 and advanced to an Officer of the Order of the British Empire in 1944, and was awarded a Distinguished Service Order in 1945. Morgan-Giles was appointed a Knight Bachelor in the 1985 New Year Honours List for political services, and was made Deputy Lieutenant of Hampshire in 1983. He also was awarded the Order of the Partisan Star (Yugoslavia) by Josip Broz Tito.

Family life
Morgan-Giles married twice (both wives predeceasing him) and had six children by his first wife, Pamela Bushell, daughter of P.H. Bushell of Darling Point, Sydney, whom he married in 1946. He wrote an autobiography for the benefit of his extensive family, entitled The Unforgiving Minute. His son, Rodney Charles Howard Morgan-Giles, married Sarah Jennifer, third daughter of Sir Hereward Wake, 14th Baronet; they have four sons and a daughter. Morgan-Giles's second daughter, Melita, married Victor Lampson, the third Baron Killearn. Morgan-Giles married Marigold Katherine Steel (nee Lowe) in July 1968, the wedding taking place at the House of Commons chapel, St Mary Undercroft. Marigold Morgan-Giles passed away on 5th December 1995. She was the daughter of renowned British surgeon and ornithologist, Percy Lowe OBE  and Dorothy Meade-Waldo of Hever Castle, Kent. Morgan-Giles died aged 98 on 4 May 2013.

See also
Barons Killearn
Wake baronets
Bolitho family

References

External links
 
 Debrett's People of Today
 www.shipwrights.co.uk

|-

1914 births
2013 deaths
People educated at Clifton College
Royal Navy rear admirals
Royal Navy officers of World War II
Companions of the Distinguished Service Order
Officers of the Order of the British Empire
Recipients of the George Medal
Conservative Party (UK) MPs for English constituencies
UK MPs 1959–1964
UK MPs 1964–1966
UK MPs 1966–1970
UK MPs 1970–1974
UK MPs 1974
UK MPs 1974–1979
Politics of Winchester
Deputy Lieutenants of Hampshire
Knights Bachelor
Admiral presidents of the Royal Naval College, Greenwich